The Road in Front of Saint-Simeon Farm in Winter is an oil-on-canvas snowscape painted by French impressionist Claude Monet. It depicts a snow-covered road in front of a barn, with tracks of a horse cart and various footsteps in the snow. The painting is one of four related works from the winter of 1867, and represents Monet’s earliest series.  They include this work, followed by Road to the Farm, Saint-Siméon, Honfleur, Road in Front of Saint-Siméon Farm in Winter, and Cart on a Snowy Road at Honfleur.

Series

See also
 List of paintings by Claude Monet

References

Paintings by Claude Monet
1867 paintings